The World Junior Alpine Skiing Championships 2014 were the 33rd World Junior Alpine Skiing Championships, held between 26 February and 6 March 2014 in Jasná, Slovakia.

Medal winners

Men's events

Women's events

Team event

External links
World Junior Alpine Skiing Championships 2014 results at fis-ski.com

World Junior Alpine Skiing Championships
2014 in alpine skiing
2014 in Slovak sport